The Die Is Cast (Swedish: Tarningen ar kastad) is a 1960 Swedish mystery thriller film directed by Rolf Husberg and starring Åke Falck, Anita Björk and Sven Lindberg. It was shot at the Centrumateljéerna Studios in Stockholm. The film's sets were designed by the art director Jan Boleslaw.

Cast
 Åke Falck as 	Jerk Domare
 Anita Björk as 	Rebecca Striid
 Sven Lindberg as 	Holger Palm
 Gio Petré as Monica Sundberg
 Gunnar Sjöberg as 	Leonard Brett
 Sif Ruud as Elly Larsson
 Sigge Fürst as Simon Odd
 Toivo Pawlo as 	Hilding Björk
 Allan Edwall as 	Dag Serén
 Olof Thunberg as 	Didrik Cornelius
 Jan Malmsjö as 	Leif Hagman
 Marie Ahlstedt as 	Dancer 
 Sten Ardenstam as Wardrober 
 Sten Lonnert as 	Ballet Master 
 Tilly Stephan as 	Waitress

References

Bibliography 
 Qvist, Per Olov & von Bagh, Peter. Guide to the Cinema of Sweden and Finland. Greenwood Publishing Group, 2000.

External links 
 

1960 films
1960s mystery thriller films
Swedish mystery thriller films
1960s Swedish-language films
Films directed by Rolf Husberg
1960s Swedish films